Lubang, officially the Municipality of Lubang,  is a 4th class municipality in the province of Occidental Mindoro, Philippines. According to the 2020 census, it has a population of 17,437 people.

The municipality encompasses the north-western half of Lubang Island, as well as Cabra Island. The municipality of Lubang is part of the Lubang Island Group, which constitutes seven islands that are geographically distinct from any landmasses, making the island group biologically unique - and endangered at the same time. The islands are under consideration to be set as a UNESCO tentative site due to its geographic importance, biological diversity, and intact rainforests.

Geography

Barangays
Lubang is politically subdivided into 16 barangays.

Climate

Demographics

Economy

Government

The Municipality of Lubang like most, if not all of the municipalities in the Philippines elects a Municipal Mayor who deals with the executive affairs of the municipality, a Municipal Vice Mayor who oversees the Municipal Council, and members of the Municipal Council. Currently, the Mayor of Lubang is Michael L. Orayani and the Vice Mayor is Charles Z. Villas.

The municipality also has ten municipal councilors, eight of which are elected along with the Mayor and Vice Mayor while the other two are from the Federation of Sangguniang Kabataan officers and the Association of Barangay Chairmen of the municipality. Currently, the following are the councilors of the municipality:

Guimba, Eugenio (NUP)
Villas, Raffy (PDPLBN)
Valisno, Cris Andrev (PDPLBN)
Abeleda, Imee (LP)
Daulat, BuliBuli (NUP)
Tiatson, Michael (LP)
Moreno, Alma (LP)
Agas, Orly (LP)
Lim, Aldous Cesar (Association of Barangay Chairmen President)

The municipality, as part of the Province of Occidental Mindoro, also elects provincial government officials. Currently, the provincial government is led by Governor Eduardo Gadiano and by Vice Governor Peter Alfaro.

In the House of Representatives of the Philippines, it is part of the Lone District of Occidental Mindoro currently represented by Congresswoman Josephine Y. Ramirez-Sato.

References

External links

Lubang Profile at PhilAtlas.com
[ Philippine Standard Geographic Code]
Philippine Census Information
Local Governance Performance Management System

Municipalities of Occidental Mindoro